Persmin Minahasa is an Indonesian football club based in Minahasa. They currently compete in the Liga 3. Their home stadium is Maesa Stadium. The team's homebase is in Tondano, Minahasa, North Sulawesi, Indonesia.

Players

Current squad

Coaching staff

Honours
 Liga 3 North Sulawesi
 Champions (2): 2018, 2021
 Runner-up (1): 2019

References

External links
 

 
Football clubs in Indonesia
Football clubs in North Sulawesi
Association football clubs established in 1963
1963 establishments in Indonesia